The Michaelsberg is a hill at Untergrombach near Bruchsal in Baden-Württemberg, Germany. A Neolithic settlement has been excavated at the top. It is the type site for the Michelsberg culture.

Mountains and hills of Baden-Württemberg